The 1882 transit of Venus, which took place on 6 December 1882 (13:57 to 20:15 UTC), was the second and last transit of Venus of the 19th century, the first having taken place eight years earlier in 1874. Many an expedition was sent by European powers to describe both episodes, eight of them alone were approved and financed in 1882 by the United States Congress.

Edward James Stone organized the British expeditions sent to observe the transit. Stephen Joseph Perry and Commander Pelham Aldrich, as captain of HMS , observed the transit from an improvised tent observatory in Madagascar.

Jean-Charles Houzeau invented in 1871 a heliometer with unequal focal lengths. For the observation of the transit he organized two expeditions: one to San Antonio, Texas, and another to Santiago de Chile. The two expeditions each had an identical copy of Houzeau's heliometer.

The French Academy of Sciences organized ten expeditions to various locations, including Florida, Mexico, Haiti, Martinique, and Cape Horn. For observations of the transit by French expeditions, for the year 1883 the French Academy of Sciences awarded nine Lalande Prizes to scientists, including Jean Jacques Anatole Bouquet de La Grye (leader of expedition to Puebla, Mexico), Octave de Bernardières (leader of expedition to San Bernardo, Chile), and the naval officer Georges-Ernest Fleuriais (leader of expedition to the coast of the province Santa Cruz in Patagonia).

The transit was observed from the United Kingdom by Samuel Cooper in Charminster and Roger Langdon at Silverton, both in Devon, and by W F Denning in Bristol. In Ireland by R S Ball, W Doberck and J L E Dreyer also saw it.

The event was celebrated in music with the Transit of Venus March by John Philip Sousa.

References

External links
1882 December 6, Venustransit, by Steven van Roode

1882 in science
Transit of Venus
December 1882 events